Henry Austen may refer to:

 Henry Thomas Austen (1771–1850), one-time militia officer, then clergyman, brother of Jane Austen
 Henry Haversham Godwin-Austen (1834–1923), English topographer, geologist and surveyor
 Henry Austen, brother-in-law of Charles Dickens and co-worker of Edwin Chadwick

See also
 Henry Austin (disambiguation)